Claytonia arctica, the Arctic spring beauty, is a species of flowering plant native to Siberia including the Taimyr Peninsula and Wrangel Island and eastward to the Aleutians and Bering Sea islands of Alaska. A plant species of the circumpolar Arctic, it has been confused with Claytonia sarmentosa and C. scammaniana. A taxonomic revision including a lectotypification of Claytonia arctica was published in 2006.

References

External links
Flora North America Treatment

arctica
Plants described in 1817